USS Miantonomoh may refer to the following ships of the United States Navy:

 , was a monitor launched in 1863 and broken up in 1875
 , was a monitor launched in 1876 and decommissioned in 1907

United States Navy ship names